Coscinopleura is an extinct genus of prehistoric bryozoans in the family Coscinopleuridae. Species are from the Paleocene of Sweden and New Jersey, United States. C. elegans and C. angusta are from the Senonian and Danian of Denmark.

See also 
 List of prehistoric bryozoan genera

References 

 Asexual propagation in the cheilostomes Metrarabdotos and Coscinopleura: Effects on genetic variation and larval productivity, p. 73–80. AH Cheetham, Bryozoan Studies 2001, Proceedings of the Twelfth …, 2002

External links 

 
 

Prehistoric bryozoan genera
Cheilostomatida
Extinct bryozoans